Sarahan is a small town in Himachal Pradesh of India. It is the site of the Bhimakali Temple, originally known as Bhimadevi Temple (Bhīmā Kālī), dedicated to the mother goddess Bhimakali, presiding deity of the rulers of the former Bushahr State. The temple is situated about 170 kilometres from Shimla and is one of 51 Shakti Peethas. The town is known as the "gateway of Kinnaur" it being near the old Indo-Tibetan Road. Seven kilometers below (17 km by road) Sarahan is the river Satluj. Sarahan is identified with the Shonitpur mentioned in Puranas.
Sarahan Bushahr has been the summer capital of Bushahr kingdom, with Rampur Bushahr considered the winter capital. The former Chief Minister of Himachal Pradesh Shree Virbhadra Singh is a member of royal family (Son of erstwhile king Padam Singh) and is popularly known as "Raja Sahab" at Sarahann. He has been member of the Assembly/Parliament since 1962 and has held the post of Chief Minister six times. His wife Rani Pratibha Devi is also a member of Assembly.

Landmarks

Temples
The Bhimakali Temple houses the "Kuldevi" (the presiding deity of the dynasty) of Bushahr Kingdom. The Bhimakali Temple contains both Hindu and Vajrayāna Buddhist statues and decorations which reflect the trade through here between India and Tibetan regions through ancient Indo-Tibetan Road. The traces of old Indo-Tibetan road still passes through Shalabag near Sarahan. Traditional wooden temple architecture is built in Kath-Kuni style. Some stone images may date to Kushan era (c. 1st to 3rd centuries CE).

There are two adjacent temple buildings. One is old and resurrected, and the other is relatively new. The temple is built in an Kath-Kuni style of architecture. Alternate rows of grooved and interlocked stones and wood provide strength to the walls. Thick walls with lower roofs found in typical mountainous region buildings provide warmth during winters. Bushahr kings are believed to be dynastic priests of the temple, and used to reside in temple premises before moving to palace 100 meters from the temple.

Palace
The King's and Queen's Palace are comparatively recent buildings adjacent to the temple. The palaces are generally not open for visitors, though there is some access to the garden and orchard. The royal family does not live there any longer and visits occasionally during Durga Puja Festival in October.

Pheasantry

Jujurana is one of the protected species of birds in the region which is also the state bird of Himachal Pradesh. Pheasantry at Sarahan (500m from temple) caters to breeding of some local species of birds. The pheasantry is closed during summer, it being the breeding season.

Hawa-Ghar
Hawa-Ghar is a small sitting area built under canopy with views of the peaks and valley. Tall trees have grown around it now and views are obstructed. Its built 2 km uphill of Sarahan.

Stadium
A stadium is built near pheasantry and a Nallah (Large Natural Drain) passes underneath it.

Hotels
The Hotel Shrikhand is located at edge of the hill. Its architecture replicates that of a Bhimakali Temple. Its design and green roof can be seen while coming from Jeori.

Stream
There is a warm water stream at Jeori just ahead of turn for Sarahan on NH22. There are dedicated bathing area with changing rooms at the stream. The stream is believed to have medicative properties by locals.

Geography and climate
It has an average elevation of 2,313 metres (7,589 feet).

The cold climate is suitable for apple farming. From November to March, the region receives moderate to heavy snowfall with intermittent rainfall. The temperature ranges from 7 ˚C to -11 ˚C. From April to July the summer season has temperatures between 10 ˚C to 28 ˚C.  From August to October, the region receives moderate rainfall.

Transport

Sarahan is 564 kilometres from New Delhi and 172 kilometres from Shimla. One can travel by train to Kalka or by air to Chandigarh and then travel by road to Sarahan. People also option for the train ride from Kalka to Shimla. Taxis and jeeps can be hired to reach to Sarahan. Bus services are also available from Chandigarh, Shimla, Rampur and Jeori. It takes approximately 6 to 8 hours by road to reach Sarahan from Shimla and 9 to 11 hours from Chandigarh. Road Connectivity gets temporarily hampered during winters due to heavy snowfall at Narkanda . There is an alternate route via Sainj which bypasses Narkanda, which is used during heavy snowfall. The NH 22 forks at Jeori (153 km from Shimla and 23 km from Rampur Bushahr) towards Sarahan making an uphill U turn. Sarahan is 17 km from Jeori. Buses ply between Sarahan and Jeori at periodic interval. Finding a taxi from Jeori might be difficult. Buses, shared taxi, public carriers are frequent between Rampur and Jeori. Buses heading to Reckongpeo also drops passengers at Jeori, where they need to take another vehicle for Sarahan. There are almost no snowfall on NH22 ahead of Narkanda and up to Jeori in winters. Snow on the roads near Sarahan are promptly cleared by government agencies. The nearest petrol pumps are at Jeori and Rampur.

People 
Virbhadra Singh - Politician
Niharika Acharya- TV Reporter/Journalist

See also 
Bhimakali temple

References

Tourism in Himachal Pradesh